Pentatrichia is a genus of African plants in the tribe Gnaphalieae within the family Asteraceae.

Species
Pentatrichia alata S.Moore - South Africa
Pentatrichia avasmontana Merxm. - Namibia
Pentatrichia petrosa Klatt - South Africa
Pentatrichia rehmii (Merxm.) Merxm. - South Africa

References

 
Asteraceae genera
Flora of Southern Africa
Taxonomy articles created by Polbot